Midex or MIDEX may refer to:

Midex
Midex Airlines, a cargo airline based in the United Arab Emirates
the callsign of the former United States airline Midwest Airlines

MIDEX
an index used by the Borsa Italiana, Italy's principal stock exchange
Medium Explorer program, a NASA spacecraft classification used in its Explorers program
a series of MIDI interfaces made by the music software and equipment manufacturer Steinberg